Mathis is a name of French origin.  It is common as a surname and is also a masculine given name.

People with the surname 
Buster Mathis (1943–1995), American heavyweight boxer
Buster Mathis Jr. (born 1970), American heavyweight boxer
Clint Mathis (born 1976), American soccer player
Damarri Mathis (born 1999), American football player
Dawson Mathis (1940–2017), American politician
Doug Mathis (born 1983), American baseball player
Edith Mathis (born 1938), Swiss singer
Émile Mathis (1880–1956), German-French automobile pioneer
George Mathis (also G. S. Mathis), pseudonym of Mátyás Seiber (1905–1960), Hungarian-born composer
Greg Mathis (born 1960), American judge
Ida Elizabeth Brandon Mathis (1857–1925), American agricultural reformer
James C. Mathis III (born 1974), American voice actor
Jeff Mathis (born 1983), American baseball catcher
Jill Mathis (born 1964), American photographer
Johnny Mathis (born 1935), American pop singer
Kevin Mathis (born 1974), American football player
Lionel Mathis (born 1981), French football player
Marcel Mathis (born 1991), Austrian alpine skier
Milly Mathis (1901–1965), French actress
Phidarian Mathis (born 1998), American football player
Rashean Mathis (born 1980), American football player
Reggie Mathis (born 1956), American football player
Rémi Mathis (born 1982), French historian
Robert Mathis (born 1981), American football player
Samantha Mathis (born 1970), American actor
Susie Mathis (born 1947), British pop singer and radio presenter
Terance Mathis (born 1967), American football player

People with the given name 
Mathis Bailey (born 1981), American-Canadian novelist and fiction writer
Mathis Bolly (born 1990), Norwegian–Ivorian footballer playing in Germany
Mathis Künzler (born 1978), Swiss actor
Mathis Mathisen (born 1937), Norwegian teacher, novelist, playwright and children's writer
Mathis Mootz (born 1976), German electronic musician and DJ
Mathis Wackernagel (born 1962), Swiss-born sustainability advocate

Fictional characters
 Title character of Mathis der Maler (opera), by Paul Hindemith
 René Mathis, ally of James Bond
 Jude Mathis, protagonist of Tales of Xillia video game
 Mathis, supporting character of 2017-2018 Nickelodeon show Mysticons 

German-language surnames
Masculine given names
Surnames from given names